Faina Sivanbayeva (born 8 November 1992) is a  Kazakhstani weightlifter.

She competed at the 2011 World Junior Weightlifting Championship,  2012 Asian Weightlifting Championship, 2015 Asian Weightlifting Championship, winning a bronze medal.

She was found to have an anti-doping rule violation, and was banned.

References 

1992 births
Kazakhstani female weightlifters
Living people
Doping cases in weightlifting
Kazakhstani sportspeople in doping cases
21st-century Kazakhstani women